Carolina Mendoza may refer to:

 Carolina Mendoza (diver) (born 1997), Mexican diver
 Carolina Mendoza (volleyball) (born 1946), Mexican volleyball player